Thomas Finney is the name of:
 Thomas Finney (lawyer) (1925–1978), American lawyer and political strategist
 Thomas Finney (politician) (1837–1903), Australian businessman and politician
 Tom Finney (1922–2014), former English footballer
 Tommy Finney (born 1952), former Northern Ireland footballer